Bermuda at the 1930 British Empire Games

Medals

Athletics

Men's 100 Yard Dash
 David Belvin - 5th in Heat 2

Officials

See also

Bermuda at the Commonwealth Games

External links

Bermuda at the Commonwealth Games
Nations at the 1930 British Empire Games
1930 in Bermuda